Eugraphe sigma is a moth of the family Noctuidae. It is found from most of Europe (except Ireland, Great Britain, the Iberian Peninsula and Greece) to the Ural, Siberia, Transcaucasia, Armenia and Korea.

Description
The length of the forewings is 17–20 mm.Warren states R. sigma Schiff. (= characterea Esp., ditrapezium Esp. nec Schiff., signum Fab., umbra View.) (10 a). 
Forewing black brown or deep brown, with a faint vinous tinge; costal area diffusely brownish-ochreous;the lines ochreous; cell dark brown; upper stigmata large, grey with black edges; claviform small, blackish;hind-wing dark fuscous. A central European species found in France, Switzerland, Germany and Austria;also in Armenia, Siberia and Amurland.  Larva reddish yellow, with dorsal and lateral lines white; a dark oblique bar on each segment with a white dot above it; feeds on low plants. - The form nubila Esp. has the costal and apical areas of forewing dull woodcolour.

Subspecies
Eugraphe sigma sigma
Eugraphe sigma melancholina Bryk, 1949 (Korea)
Eugraphe sigma anthracina Boursin, 1954

Biology
Adults are on wing from June to July in one generation per year.

The larvae feed on various low-growing plants, including Lamium album, Viburnum lantana, Laburnum anagyroides, Prunus spinosa, Lonicera and Ligustrum species. Young larvae live in the top parts of the host plant. The species overwinters in the larval stage. After overwintering, the larvae hide during the day and feed on the terminal part of the twigs during the night. Pupation takes place in the ground.

References

Noctuinae
Moths described in 1775
Moths of Japan
Moths of Europe
Taxa named by Ignaz Schiffermüller